Ābeļi Parish is an administrative unit of Jēkabpils Municipality, Latvia.

History 
In the territory of present-day Ābeļi Parish, there was historically an Abelhof manor ( Gut Abelhof, Ābeļu), Janopol manor ( Gut Janopol , Brodi ).

In the 19th century was established Salas parish on the left bank of Daugava, in vicinity of Jekabpils. In 1925 it was renamed Ābeļi Parish. In 1935 Parish occupied area of 199 km² and had population of 2532 people. In 1945, Ābeļi, Ezera and Salas were united into the parish  village council, but the parish was liquidated in 1949. In 1954, in Dregen village kolkhoz 'Soviet homeland' was created. In 1990 the village was reorganized into a parish. In 2009, Ābeļi Parish was included as an administrative territory in Jekabpils county.

Settlements 
The largest populated areas are Brodi (parish center), Ābeļi, Ķeikāni, Laši, Nagļi, Piļkas, Platačkalns, Rubuļkalns, Saldes, Silacaunes, Sīļukalns, Veselība.
.

Notable people 
 Jānis Akuraters (1876-1937) — writer
  (1892-1954) — Latvian officer

References 

Jēkabpils Municipality
Parishes of Latvia